The Marylebone Cricket Club tour of Australia in 1965–66 under the captaincy of M.J.K. Smith was its fourteenth since it took official control of overseas tours in 1903-1904. The touring team played as England in the 1965–66 Ashes series against Australia, but as the MCC in all other games. In all there were 24 matches; 5 Test matches (which they drew 1–1), 10 other first-class matches (which they won 4–1) and 9 minor matches (which they won 8–0). The strength of the team's batting and the weakness of its bowling is shown by having 10 batsmen averaging over 40, but only one bowler under 30, the part-time leg-spinner Ken Barrington. The MCC team manager Billy Griffith encouraged the naturally cautious Smith to make sporting declarations and make run-chases in the tour matches, though this became less prevalent towards the end.

Travelling to Australia
The MCC team were the first to travel to Australia by air instead of by sea, but still landed in Western Australia for their first games before travelling to the eastern states. En route they had stopped in Ceylon to play two light-hearted one day games, in which they were labelled "Marylebone Cricket Clowns" by the press. and Singapore. As they used economy class conditions were cramped on the long haul flights and several players complained of cramps, sore limbs and a mystery virus and many experienced jet lag for the first time. Fred Titmus left late because of stomach ailments, and said that it took until the First Test for him to fully recover. Ken Higgs and David Larter remained ill for most of the tour. Geoff Boycott picked up a stomach bug in Singapore and his arrival in Australia was delayed by a week. The rugby union and rugby league teams that flew out to Australia that season suffered from the same ailments.

Western Australia Country vs MCC

After a few days to recover from their flight and practice in the nets the MCC went to play a Country team at Moora, Western Australia. These country games were popular with the Australian Board of Control as they promoted cricket away from the cities and the tourists as they provided easy games. There were nine such games on the tour and they could pall after a while, but the players were feted by the locals and some regarded them as the most enjoyable part of the tour. The MCC batted first and made 232/7 with John Edrich making 66 with 11 fours, Jim Parks 48, M.J.K. Smith 36, Fred Titmus 36 not out and the spinner Terry Gale 3/57. Ken Higgs (2/8) quickly removed the opener Pascoe for a duck and Gale for 3, but was taken off after four overs as he sank into the soft turf. A young farmer named John McCormack (64) added 122 runs for the next two wickets before being bowled by Fred Titmus (3/34). From 133/3 the country team unexpectedly fell to 150 all out thanks to the leg-spin of Bob Barber whose 0/56 became 5/64 after changing from cricket boots to light shoes. The MCC won by 82 runs, though there is a discrepancy in the scorecard as only two batsmen are recorded being dismissed by Titmus while Barber has six victims.

Western Australia vs MCC

After the warm up game the MCC proceeded to Perth to play at the Western Australian Cricket Association Ground. Western Australia was the newest side in the Sheffield Shield and it would be five years before the WACA's inaugural Test in the 1970-71 Ashes series. Barrington, Boycott, and Brown were ill, and the MCC team was chosen from the 13 fit players, including the two wicket-keepers. Mike Smith loss the toss and batted even though the local captain Barry Shepherd had the habit of asking visitors to bat. Bob Barber (126), John Edrich (33) and Eric Russell (81) added a brisk 197 for the first two wickets. Smith (67 not out) and the wicketkeeper Jim Parks (107 not out) hit 175 for the six wicket and the MCC declared for 447/5 on the second morning. Bill Playle (45) and Peter Kelly (126) batted slowly to add 91 for the first wicket, but Western Australia collapsed to 303/9 with only Derek Chadwick (52 not out) offering any late resistance to the fast bowling of Jeff Jones who took five wickets for nine runs. Shepherd declared after avoiding the follow on and Edrich (45) and Peter Parfitt (48) added 75 for the third wicket, before being removed by the leg-spinner Terry Jenner (4/72). Parks and Dave Allen had hit 53 runs for the sixth wicket when Smith asked his manager Billy Griffiths when he should declare, Griffiths said "Now" and their 156/5 left Western Australia 274 minutes to make 301 runs for victory. David Larter (4/49) had them 53/3, with the opener Pat Kelley retired hurt after being hit on the head by a bouncer by the tall Scottish bowler. There was a short break to listen to the Melbourne Cup and Kelley returned to add 171 with Murray Vernon, the highest fourth wicket stand for Western Australia against the MCC. Though in sight of victory the hosts collapsed once Vernon was bowled for 118 by Jones (2/39), Kelly was left stranded on 108 not out, the first Western Australian to make two centuries in a match against the MCC, with no other batsman making more than 11. Western Australia were out for 291 to give the MCC a thrilling 9 run win in the last minute. "That's the last time I take the ruddy manager's advice on a declaration" joked Smith.

Western Australia Combined XI vs MCC

As Perth did not have a Test match, players from the eastern states were sent to strengthen Western Australia for a second game against the tourists. On this occasion only the veteran batsman Peter Burge of Queensland and the young Bob Cowper of Victoria were flown over. Barry Shepherd won the toss and put the MCC in to bat on a day interrupted by four showers. After an opening stand of 74 between Bob Barber (34) and John Edrich (92), Laurie Mayne (3/98) reduced them to 199/6. M.J.K. Smith (112 not out) and Fred Titmus (69) restored the situation with a seventh wicket stand of 139 before Smith declared at 379/7 during a shower in the second afternoon 'to get out of the wet'. Murray Vernon and Pat Kelly added 47 runs in ten overs before they were out in successive balls. Cowper (89) and Burge (52) top-scored in the Combined XI's slow 231/5, Shepherd again declaring after the follow on had been avoided. In reply Bob Barber (113) reached 100 in 89 minutes and helped by Peter Parfitt, Colin Cowdrey and Smith, who all made 24, the MCC made 205/4 to leave the hosts 354 runs to win in 273 minutes. Vernon (44) and Kelly (33) added 71 for the first wicket and Cowper made 122 not out, adding 87 with Burge (50) and 84 with Shepherd (39 not out), but they fell 32 runs short with 4 wickets in hand and the game was a draw.

South Australia vs MCC

M.J.K. Smith won the toss and put South Australia in to bat. Usually the Adelaide Oval was the flattest in Australia, but the Sheffield Shield match beforehand had been affected by a dust-storm followed by a sudden 22 degree drop in temperature. The wicket planned for the MCC match was unusable and an old wicket from a state match was used instead. Captain Les Favell (9) and Lynn Marks (30) added 25 for the first wicket, after which six wickets fell in nine overs as David Larter (3/29), Dave Brown (3/35) and Dave Allen (4/24) bowled them out for 103. Geoff Boycott (94) and John Edrich (61) passed this with an opening stand of 116 in 83 minutes. Boycott had been ill and this was his first innings in Australia, hitting his first ball for four. After they were out only Ken Barrington (69) made any runs as Neil Hawke (3/71) and David Sincock (5/113) took control, and the MCC were out for 310. Les Favell (96) and Marks (67) gave South Australia a better start with 150 for the first wicket, the wicketkeeper Barry Jarman made 61 and Alan Shiell 83 in a total of 364. Thanks to their low first innings this only gave the MCC 158 runs to win and they made them for the loss of 4 wickets on the fourth morning, Barrington making 51 and Hawke (2/49) and Sincock (2/67) against the best bowlers.

Victoria Country vs MCC

In another friendly country match the locals team batted first and sportingly declared for 167/6 with Bob Barber taking 4/21 with his leg spin, being fed loose balls to give the tourists some sort of target, and having their innings declared by the umpires after 46 overs in accordance with local grade cricket rules. In reply Barber's first four balls were 264W and the MCC made 168/4 in 95 minutes, but batted on to 264 to entertain the 4,500 strong crowd. Eric Russell made 50, Jim Parks hit 75 and the local fast bowler R. McKenzie took 4/44.

Victoria vs MCC

Bill Lawry won the toss for Victoria and elected to bat, making 153 himself and adding 104 for the first wicket with Ian Redpath (53). When Lawry reached 100 his bails were found on the ground and Cowdrey and Murray appealed for hit wicket, but the umpire gave him not out as no one has seen the bails knocked off. In the afternoon Dave Brown took 4/77 to reduce them to 262/7. The following morning Graeme Watson made 59 not out and added 122 runs with Bob Cowper's brother David Cowper (the wicketkeeper), who made 60 not out on his First Class debut. Lawry declared on 384/7 and almost bowled out the MCC in the remainder of the day, they were 211/9 at stumps and all out for the same score first thing on the third day. John Edrich and M.J.K. Smith both made 46, but Keith Stackpole's 4/64 with his occasional off-spin that caused the most damage on a turning wicket. Lawry declined to enforce the follow on and batted again, making 61, but seeing his team fall for 165 to the Fred Titmus (4/50) and Ken Barrington (4/24). This left the MCC 329 to win, but Alan Connolly (4/84) removed Bob Barber for a duck and Edrich for 1 before they recovered to 65/2 at the end of the day. Ken Barrington dug himself in for 158 "an innings of rugged, fighting grandeur", and added 160 for the fourth wicket with Colin Cowdrey. After Cowdrey was out for a lacklustre 52 the tail collapsed to Watson's medium paced bowling (3/24) to be out for 306, 32 runs short of their goal. The defeat did little to dampen the MCC's reputation for exciting cricket as they had chased the runs, and it was their only defeat until the Fourth Test.

Victoria Country vs MCC

This match was arranged by Harry Alexander, the "Bull Alexander" who had played against Douglas Jardine's team in 1932-33. It was abandoned after heavy rain, which continued until the mid-afternoon. The MCC made themselves popular by signing autographs and chatting to the townsfolk from 10 am to 4 pm.

New South Wales vs MCC

New South Wales had been the dominant team in the Sheffield Shield and in 1965–66 would win their fourteenth title since the war, but their last for fifteen years. Mike Smith won the toss and only Peter Parfitt failed to pass 50 in the MCC's 527/6 declared. Bob Barber (90) and Eric Russell (93) added 150 for the first wicket in the morning session, until Barber underestimated Booth's fielding, and was run out going for a century before lunch. Colin Cowdrey and Jim Parks both made 63, Smith 59 and the spinners Fred Titmus (80 not out) and Dave Allen (54 not out) made 121 runs for the seventh wicket. The leg-spinner Peter Philpott was the best of the suffering bowlers with 3/126 and the wicketkeeper Brian Taber took three catches, stumped Russell and ran out Parfitt. The New South Wales reply relied heavily on a third wicket stand of 142 between the 19-year-old Doug Walters (129) and his captain Brian Booth (80), who was standing in for the injured Bobby Simpson. They were out for 288 thanks to the fast bowling of Jeff Jones (3/76), before he was banned from bowling by Umpire Burgess because he was running down the wicket and leaving a groove that could be exploited by the bowlers. The spin of Titmus (3/54) and Allen (2/75) took over and Smith made NSW follow on. Grahame Thomas top scored with 56, but they were out for 240 to Titmus (5/45) and Allen (2/47). The batsmen Barry Rothwell bowled the only over and had Barber out for a duck, but Parfitt made the two runs required and the MCC won by 9 wickets. It was the first time that the MCC had defeated New South Wales since Douglas Jardine beat them by an innings in 1932–33.

Queensland vs MCC

With his vice captain Colin Cowdrey ill for most of December M.J.K. Smith continued to captain the MCC, won the toss and batted. Geoff Boycott rejoined the touring team after suffering sciatica and made 30, but Bob Barber retired ill at 21. The other openers Eric Russell (110) and John Edrich (133) came in next and the MCC passed 250 for the loss of one wicket. Ken Barrington (80 not out) and Fred Titmus (51 not out) added 86 for the sixth wicket and Smith declared at 452/5 on the afternoon of the second day. In reply Queensland were out for 222, with Des Bull (25) and Sam Trimble (34) adding 59 for the first wicket and captain Peter Burge making most of the rest with an unbeaten 114. The wickets were shared around the bowlers with Jeff Jones taking 2/36, Ken Higgs 3/35, Fred Titmus 2/79 and the recovered Barber 2/33. Boycott and Smith were out for ducks in the MCC's second innings, Russell retired hurt on 45, John Edrich made 68 not out and they declared on 123/2. Queensland were set 364 runs to win in 272 minutes and survived the day on 315/8. Trimble (31) and Bull (64) made another good start with 65 for the first wicket, Burge made 60 and Tom Veivers 74. Again the wickets were spread around with Titmus the best with 3/56, but Barber was hit for 1/74 off 10 overs.

Queensland Country vs MCC

Unusually the MCC were scheduled to play a minor game immediately before the First Test and travelled 80 miles inland to the large town of Toowoomba. Mike Smith won the toss, fielded and used 10 bowlers in the Queensland Country innings before they declared on 157/4, Gary Jennings making nearly half their runs with his 77. Bob Barber made 56 of his 80 run opening stand with Geoff Boycott, who hung around to make 48 not out in the MCC's 159/3 as they won by seven wickets.

First Test – Brisbane

See Main Article – 1965–66 Ashes series

Prime Minister's XI vs MCC

The Prime Minister of Australia Robert Menzies was a keen cricket fan and the match between his personally chosen XI and the MCC was a highlight of the tour, followed by a banquet in which the Menzies would entertain the teams with a speech. His team consisted of Australian Test players such as Wally Grout, Alan Connolly and Bob Cowper, retired veterans Neil Harvey, Richie Benaud and Jim Burke, young talent like Keith Stackpole, the teenaged Paul Sheahan as well as the famous West Indian fast bowler Wes Hall, who was playing for Queensland. Benaud captained the team and fulfilled 90% of his duties by winning the toss and choosing to bat. Thanks to Burke (79), Sheahan (60), Benaud (45) and Stackpole (32 not out) the Prime Minister's XI hit 288/7 in 35 overs, with the wickets shared amongst the touring bowlers with Jeff Jones taking 2/21, David Larter 2/43 and Bob Barber 2/72. The declaration came halfway through the day and the MCC's winning 289/8 also took 35 overs, though they passed 200 for the loss of two wickets as Geoff Boycott made 95 before he was run out, Colin Cowdrey 52 and M.J.K. Smith 51 not out. Eight bowlers were used, but the best was Jim Burke who took 2/5 with his infamous chucking action, dismissing John Murray and Jones for ducks in the closing minutes of the match.

New South Wales Country vs MCC

The New South Wales Country XI batted first and were all out for 221. Terry Bourke, an ex-New South Wales Colt, top-scored with 64, but seven other batsmen got into double figures in an all round effort. The part-time spinners Ken Barrington (6/92) and Peter Parfitt (2/57) did most of the bowling, but Barry Knight took 2/15. Knight (32) opened the batting with the wicketkeeper John Murray (25) and Parfitt made 36, but it was Barrington (61) and John Edrich (67 not out) who made the winning runs. They carried on batting after the win until Barrington was out and they match was called to an end.

New South Wales Country vs MCC

Another New South Wales Country XI batted first and were reduced to 32/4 by the left-arm fast bowler Jeff Jones (3/13) before Longmore (38) and Stacy (56 not out) added 80 for the fifth wicket. Ken Barrington's leg-spin was again widely used as he took 4/72, though the tailender Sargeant made 35 out of a stand of 41 for the seventh wicket and the Country XI made 190. Peter Parfitt opened the batting and made 41, adding 80 with the captain Mike Smith (81), who then added 61 with John Edrich (76) in a five wicket win. Again the MCC carried on batting, providing Edrich and Barrington (24 not out) with some batting practice.

South Australia Country vs MCC

David Larter (3/31) had the South Australian Country XI 6/1, but their opener Broadbridge went on to make made 36. Their best batsmen were Fischer (40 not out) and Parson (37 not out) who had added 76 for the seventh wicket when their captain declared. Thanks to Geoff Boycott (99) the MCC made these runs easily, he added 82 for the first wicket with John Edrich (45) and 90 for the second with Peter Parfitt (56 not out), who remained with captain Colin Cowdrey (19 not out) for some batting practice after the 8 wicket victory.

South Australia vs MCC

After a string of four minor games the MCC played South Australia on either side of Christmas, with Christmas Day and Boxing Day being rest days. Les Favell won the toss and batted. Lynn Marks and Les Cunningham were out for ducks, but Favell (40) added 58 for the second wicket with Ian Chappell (59), followed by Brian Shiell who made his highest First Class score of 202 not out, adding 146 with Barry Jarman (70), 51 with George Griffiths (23) and 129 with David Sincock (28 not out) when Favell declared at 459/5 at lunch on the second day. Chappell caught Geoff Boycott for a duck and with Peter Parfitt out for 6 the MCC were 13/2 before Bob Barber (46) and Colin Cowdrey (18) added 53 for the third wicket. M.J.K. Smith made 108, adding 136 with Ken Barrington (63), while John Murray (110) and Fred Titmus (79) put together 164 for the eight wicket. The MCC's 444 nearly matched South Australia's score and Favell set about making runs for a declaration, Ian Chappell hitting 113 not out as they rattled up 253/4 in 249 minutes. Left to make 269 runs in three hours the MCC responded in kind, Boycott (58) and Barber (77) made 138 for the first wicket, Cowdrey made 63 not out and the all rounder Barry Knight (46) was promoted up the order so that he could hit some quick runs. The tourists made 270/4 and won a good-natured match by 6 wickets.

Second Test – Melbourne

See Main Article – 1965–66 Ashes series

Third Test – Sydney

See Main Article – 1965–66 Ashes series

Northern New South Wales vs MCC

The MCC played the combined grade teams of Northern New South Wales in a three-day game at the industrial town of Newcastle. The New South Welshmen batted first and Charlie Barker (101) became only the second player to make a century in a minor game against the MCC since the war. He added 196 for the fourth wicket with Michael Hill (98) as the home team made 334, with Bob Barber taking 4/57 with his leg-spin. The MCC were in real trouble at 106/5, but M.J.K. Smith (160) and Fred Titmus (114) added 260 runs for the sixth wicket and with Barry Knight hitting a late 35 not out the MCC totalled 449 for a lead of 115. John Scobie (35) and Ian Barton (20) made 57 for the first wicket, but Fred Titmus took 4/24 and they were out for 126, leaving the MCC just 12 runs to make for a 10 wicket victory.

Tasmania vs MCC

Tasmania was much weaker than the other states in the 1960s and would not play in the Sheffield Shield until 1976–77, so the arrival of the MCC from the mainland was greeted with much anticipation. The captain of Tasmania was the wicketkeeper Len Maddocks, who had moved there from Victoria, but he lost the toss and M.J.K. Smith who rested some of his best players and decided to open the batting with Bob Barber. Smith top-scored with 96 and Jim Parks 91, though fellow-keeper John Murray was out for a duck. Colin Cowdrey made 63 and Barry Knight a quick-fire 45 not out. The fast-medium bowler Harold Allen took 3/63 and the leg-spinner Ken Flint suffered with 3/133. Smith declared on 371/9 and put Tasmania in to bat at the end of the first day, but they lost no wickets before stumps. They made steady progress, Kevin Brown and John Archer added 49 for the first wicket, Brian Richardson (112) made his maiden First Class century and Brian Patterson 67 not out, adding 48 for the last wicket with Flint (4) in a total of 322. Ken Higgs took 3/57 and Dave Allen 3/41. This was only a three-day game and Smith opened with Peter Parfitt late on the last morning. They added 46 for the first wicket, then Cowdrey (108), Parks (58) and Knight (51 not out) batted out the day with 289/7. It was the first tour match in which the MCC had not gone for a win, a policy which continued for the last few games and this rubbed some of the shine off their earlier bright cricket.

Tasmania Combined XI vs MCC

With Tasmania being so weak they were reinforced with Test players from the mainland for their second match, as Western Australia had been at the start of the tour, so Bill Lawry and Bob Cowper of Victoria and Doug Walters of New South Wales were flown out to Hobart. Len Maddocks won the toss and batted, but though Lawry made 47, Cowper 53 and Walters 46 none of the Tasmanians exceeded 11 and they were spun out for 119 by Fred Titmus (6/65). Geoff Boycott (156) and Eric Russell (58) made an opening stand of 107, captain Colin Cowdrey 70 and John Murray 83 not out as the MCC batted into the third and last day before declaring on 471/9. The Combined XI needed to make 272 runs to avoid an innings defeat and though Kevin Brown was out for a duck Lawry (126 not out) and Cowper (143 not out) made a second wicket stand of 273 in 257 minutes and the match was called off as a draw.

Fourth Test – Adelaide

See Main Article – 1965–66 Ashes series

New South Wales vs MCC

The MCC returned to Sydney for their second match against New South Wales, but Bobby Simpson was in charge and he opened the batting with Norm O'Neill after winning the toss. O'Neill made 38 in their stand of 77, then Simpson (123) added 156 for the second wicket with Grahame Thomas (126). Doug Walters made 57 as New South Wales hit 374/4 on the first day. They completed their innings of 488 on the rain-affected second day, with Dave Allen taking 4/96 and Barry Knight 3/81. The MCC replied with 84/2 by stumps, but were out for 329 the following afternoon – Peter Parfitt 87, Bob Barber 49 and Mike Smith 40 – and were forced to follow on. This time they did better, Geoff Boycott (77) and Barber (75) put on 120 for the first wicket, Boycott and John Edrich (47) 61 for the second, Eric Russell (101 not out) and Smith (64) 105 for the fifth and Russell and Knight (94) 150 for the sixth. Simpson took 4/71 with his leg-spin, but the match was doomed to a draw.

Fifth Test – Melbourne

See Main Article – 1965–66 Ashes series

1965–66 tour averages
source

References

Further reading
 E.W. Swanton, Swanton in Australia, with MCC 1946–1975, Fontana, 1977
 Fred Titmus with Stafford Hildred, My Life in Cricket, John Blake Publishing Ltd, 2005
 Peter Arnold, The Illustrated Encyclopedia of World Cricket, W.H. Smith, 1986
 John Arlott, John Arlott's 100 Greatest Batsman, Macdonald Queen Anne Press, 1986
 Trevor Bailey, Richie Benaud, Colin Cowdrey and Jim Laker The Lord's Taverners Fifty Greatest, Heinemann-Quixote, 1983
 Ashley Brown, The Pictorial History of Cricket, Bison Books, 1988
 David Frith, Pageant of Cricket, The Macmillan Company of Australia, 1987
 Tom Graveney with Norman Giller, The Ten Greatest Test Teams, Sidgewick & Jackson, 1988

External links
 CricketArchive tour itinerary

1965 in Australian cricket
1965 in English cricket
1966 in Australian cricket
1966 in English cricket
Australian cricket seasons from 1945–46 to 1969–70
English cricket tours of Australia
International cricket competitions from 1960–61 to 1970
Australia 1965-66